Kathleen Dunbar (born October 3, 1950) is a former member of the Arizona House of Representatives. She served in the House from January 1999 through January 2001, representing district 13. She did not run for re-election in 2000, choosing instead to run for the state senate.  She ran unopposed in the Republican primary, but lost in the general election to Andy Nichols.

References

Republican Party members of the Arizona House of Representatives
1950 births
Living people